Christchurch is an unincorporated community in Middlesex County, Virginia, United States. Christchurch has a post office with the ZIP Code 23031.

Christchurch is the home of Christchurch School, established in 1921.

References

Unincorporated communities in Middlesex County, Virginia
Unincorporated communities in Virginia